Trinity Academy is a non-selective co-educational secondary school in the English Academy programme, at Thorne near Doncaster, South Yorkshire, England.

It is a member of the Emmanuel Schools Foundation, established by entrepreneur Sir Peter Vardy to educate pupils within a Christian ethos.

History
The school opened in September 2005 and replaced Thorne Grammar School, established in 1930, which became a comprehensive school in 1973. The majority of the Grammar School's building was demolished, but its war memorial plaque and window were moved to the new Academy building and re-dedicated.  The main, Georgian style frontage of the school was subsequently converted into apartments in 2009, with new mews style houses built on the former grass tennis courts along the frontage facing Church Balk.

The school has received rewards from the Specialist schools and Academies trust for being the 'Most Improved Academy in England & Wales' in 2008 and 'Most Improved Academy in Yorkshire & Humberside' in the years 2008, 2009 and 2010. The school was deemed 'Outstanding' by Ofsted in March 2011. However, in December 2013 Ofsted placed the school in 'special measures.' As of 2015, the school is no longer in 'special measures.'

Notable alumni

Thorne Grammar School

 Peter Davies (politician), Mayor of Doncaster from 2009 to '13, and father of Conservative rebel MP Philip Davies
 Lesley Garrett, opera singer and Principal Soprano from 1984 to '98 with the English National Opera 
 Leslie Hodson, physicist from Fishlake who discovered the kaon (K+ meson) sub-atomic particle in 1954 and did important work with cloud chambers
 Jill Morrell, author, campaigner, motivational speaker, and Head of Public Affairs with the British Lung Foundation
 George Porter, Baron Porter of Luddenham, awarded the Nobel Prize in Chemistry in 1967, knighted in 1972, President from 1985 to '90 of the Royal Society, and Chancellor from 1986 to '95 of the University of Leicester 
 E. A. Smith (historian)

Other Emmanuel Schools

See also
 List of schools in Doncaster

References

External links
 Trinity Academy website
 Emmanuel Schools Foundation website
 Thorne Grammar School Alumni website
 Thorne Grammar School Reunion website (4,400 members)
 Ofsted reports
 EduBase

Video clips
 Tour of the old school in 2005

Educational institutions established in 2005
Academies in Doncaster
Secondary schools in Doncaster
Emmanuel Schools Foundation
Thorne, South Yorkshire
People educated at Thorne Grammar School
2005 establishments in England